Ezhukone  is a village in Kollam district in the state of Kerala, India between Kottarakara and Kundara .

Transportation 
 Ezhukone railway station on Kollam–Sengottai branch line is very close to the town.
 Ezhukone is situated along Kollam - Thirumangalam National Highway 744 (India) and is well connected with Kollam, Kottarakkara, Punalur etc. by Kerala State Road Transport Corporation buses

 Nearest airport is Trivandrum International Airport

Important Institutions 
Govt Polytechnic Ezhukone 
 VHSS Ezhukone
 Irumpanangadu School
ESIC Hospital Ezhukone
Govt.Technical Vocational Higher Secondary School
Sree Sree Academy, ezhukone

Demographics
 India census,Ezhukone had a population of 23741 with 11414 males and 12327 females.

References

Villages in Kollam district